Chalaza is a genus of mites in the family Laelapidae.

Species
 Chalaza novena R. Domrow, 1990

References

Laelapidae